The King's Birthday match is an annual Australian rules football match between the Melbourne Football Club and Collingwood Football Club in the Australian Football League (AFL), held at the Melbourne Cricket Ground (MCG) on the King's Birthday public holiday in Victoria (the second Monday in June).

Since 2015, the match has been preceded by the Big Freeze, a charitable event raising funds into research for motor neuron disease (MND). The event sees celebrities slide into a pool of ice water as a curtain-raiser to the match.

History
Football has been played on the Queen's or King's Birthday public holiday since the first season of the Victorian Football League in 1897. In most years the VFL scheduled three matches to take place on the public holiday. Since 1936 the public holiday has been set as the second Monday in June. Melbourne and Collingwood first faced off in a Queen's Birthday fixture in Round 3 of the 1898 season, with Melbourne winning by 10 points.

Both teams have a long-standing rivalry dating back to the 1950s and 1960s when the two side were the dominant forces in the VFL. Having defeated Collingwood in the 1955 and 1956 Grand Finals, Melbourne was prevented from equalling the Magpie's record four flags in a row in the 1958 Grand Final. That year, a crowd of 99,256 saw a top of the table match between the two teams on the Queen's Birthday public holiday; as of 2022 that crowd figure remains a record for the highest ever home-and-away crowd. Melbourne would later defeat the Magpies in the 1960 and 1964 Grand Finals. Almost half of Melbourne's 13 VFL/AFL Premierships came against Collingwood and the teams have met in seven grand finals, the most of any pairing.

Since 2001, the AFL has scheduled Melbourne against Collingwood at the MCG as the only match played on the public holiday each year, and this is considered the start of the modern Queen's Birthday match as a stand-alone event. Prior to this, Melbourne and Collingwood had faced each other on the King's/Queen's Birthday public holiday on ten occasions: 1898, 1950, 1958, 1961, 1964, 1977, 1983, 1993, 1996 and 1999; among those, the 1996 match was the only time it was the sole match scheduled for the day. The round in which the game is played is sometimes referred to as the "Queen's Birthday Round", although Queensland and Western Australia do not celebrate the Queen's Birthday public holiday on the same date.

The fixture is traditionally staged at the Melbourne Cricket Ground, which is the home ground for both teams. However, from 2001 until 2018, the match was always a designated Melbourne home game, resulting in Melbourne receiving a greater portion of the gate and its highest match profit of each season, typically in the order of $800,000 to $900,000. Collingwood, which had a substantially higher membership and more blockbuster fixtures than Melbourne, agreed to and encouraged the deal over that period. Since 2019, when a period of success had seen Melbourne close the financial gap between the clubs, the clubs have agreed to alternate the home team designation between the two clubs each year, with Collingwood's first home game played in 2019.

The COVID-19 pandemic interrupted the game's continuity for two years: the match was not played at all in 2020, and was relocated to the Sydney Cricket Ground at short notice due to a lockdown in Victoria in 2021.

Match results
This table lists all Queen's/King's Birthday matches since it became an annual fixture between Melbourne and Collingwood in 2001.

* Capacity reduced due to redevelopment at the Melbourne Cricket Ground for the 2006 Commonwealth Games
1 2001–2014: three Brownlow votes, 2015–present: Neale Daniher trophy
2 Player also received three Brownlow votes
3 Match was played at the Sydney Cricket Ground instead of the Melbourne Cricket Ground

Big Freeze at the 'G
In 2014, former Melbourne coach for ten years (1998–2007) Neale Daniher was diagnosed with motor neuron disease (MND) and set about helping raise funds for researching the disease. The Big Freeze at the 'G is a Motor Neurone Disease fundraiser event at the MCG partner with the AFL's Queen's Birthday match. In support of the "Cure for MND Foundation", several well known football and television personalities get dunked into a giant ice pool on the ground before the start of the game. Such personalities usually pledge to raise $10,000 for vital MND research after being nominated, and once successful at hitting this target, they then get to pass on the challenge and nominate the next personality into the "cold seat". This person in turn will raise funds and agree to "Freeze for MND" if their fundraising goal is met. The challenge will continue right up until the game, with each celebrity challenging the next. The first Big Freeze was held in 2015, and the Neale Daniher Trophy was established in the same year and awarded to the best player on the ground in the game.

Participants
Big Freeze 1 (2015)
Over $2.2 million was raised.
 Tim Watson, former  player, AFL commentator for the Seven Network.
 Sam Lane, Television and radio personality, journalist and commentator.
 Ross Stevenson, radio personality for 3AW.
 Dermott Brereton, former  player, television and radio commentator for Fox Footy and SEN 1116.
 Sam Newman, former  player, TV and radio personality, host of The Footy Show.
 Brian Taylor, former  player, TV and radio commentator for the Seven Network and Triple M.
 Garry Lyon, former  player, TV and radio commentator, host of The Footy Show.
 Mick Molloy, comedian, TV and radio personality for Triple M.
 Mark Robinson, Journalist, television and newspaper personality, host of AFL 360.
 Bryan 'Strauchanie' Strauchan, fictional  football player portrayed by comedian Peter Helliar, TV and radio personality.

Big Freeze 2 (2016)
Over $4 million was raised.
 Matthew Richardson, former  player, AFL commentator for the Seven Network.
 Matthew Lloyd, former Essendon player, AFL commentator for 3AW.
 Kevin Sheedy, legendary AFL player and coach.
 Eddie McGuire, President of Collingwood, AFL commentator for Fox Footy and Triple M radio.
 Samantha Armytage, Australian journalist, host of Sunrise.
 Jonathan Brown, former  player, TV and radio personality, Fox Footy and Nova 100.
 Anthony Lehmann, comedian, TV and radio personality, Network Ten and Gold 104.3.
 Cameron Ling, former  player, AFL commentator for the Seven Network.
 Gerard Whateley, ABC Sports commentator, host of AFL 360.
 Dave Hughes, comedian, TV and radio personality, recurring panellist on The Footy Show.

Big Freeze 3 (2017)
 Lleyton Hewitt, Australian tennis champion, former world number 1.
 Steve Hooker, Australian Pole Vaulter, Olympic gold medallist.
 Alisa Camplin, Australian aerial skier, Olympic gold medallist.
 Steven Bradbury, Australian speed skater, Olympic gold medallist.
 Steve Moneghetti, Australian long-distance runner, Commenwealth gold medallist.
 Andrew Gaze, Australian basketballer, 2x NBA champion.
 Sharelle McMahon, Australian netballer
 Adam Gilchrist, Australian cricketer

Big Freeze 4 (2018)
 Don Pyke, Adelaide senior coach
 Chris Fagan, Brisbane Lions senior coach
 Brendon Bolton, Carlton senior coach
 Nathan Buckley, Collingwood senior coach
 John Worsfold, Essendon senior coach
 Ross Lyon, Fremantle senior coach
 Chris Scott, Geelong senior coach
 Stuart Dew, Gold Coast senior coach
 Leon Cameron, Greater Western Sydney senior coach
 Alastair Clarkson, Hawthorn senior coach
 Simon Goodwin, Melbourne senior coach
 Brad Scott, North Melbourne senior coach
 Ken Hinkley, Port Adelaide senior coach
 Damien Hardwick, Richmond senior coach
 John Longmire, Sydney Swans senior coach
 Alan Richardson, St Kilda senior coach
 Adam Simpson, West Coast Eagles senior coach
 Luke Beveridge, Western Bulldogs senior coach

Big Freeze 5 (2019)
 Cyril Rioli, former Hawthorn player
 Lauren Jackson, former basketball player
 Dane Swan, former Collingwood player
 Nick Riewoldt, former St Kilda player
 Brendan Fevola, former Carlton & Brisbane Lions player
 Jimmy Bartel, former Geelong player
 Anna Meares, former Olympic cyclist
 Bianca Chatfield, former netball player
 Jobe Watson, former Essendon player
 Chris Judd, former West Coast & Carlton player
 Liam Picken, former Western Bulldogs player
 Bob Murphy, former Western Bulldogs player
 Sam Mitchell, former Hawthorn & West Coast player
 Brent Harvey, former North Melbourne player

Big Freeze 6 (2020)
No Queen's Birthday match was played due to the COVID-19 pandemic, but a Big Freeze television event occurred with a player from every club involved.

Big Freeze 7 (2021)
Big Freeze 7 was held at the Melbourne Cricket Ground on the day of the Queen's Birthday match, but the match itself was staged at the Sydney Cricket Ground due to the COVID-19 pandemic.
 Craig Bellamy, Melbourne Storm (NRL) coach
 Abbey Holmes, former  player
 Billy Brownless, former  player
 Shane Crawford, 1999 Brownlow Medal winner and former  player 
 Ray Chamberlain, AFL umpire
 Sharni Norder, former netball player and  player, Bounce panelist
 Sarah Jones, Fox Footy host
 Jeff Farmer, former  and  player
 Daisy Pearce,  captain
 Gillon McLachlan, AFL CEO

Big Freeze 8 (2022)
 Ash Barty, former world No. 1 tennis player
 Eddie Betts, former  &  player
 Terry Daniher, former  player & older brother to Neale
 Rhonda Burchmore, entertainer & actor
 Hamish Blake, comedian &  supporter
 Andrew Maher, co-host of The Front Bar 
 Rebecca Maddern, Seven News Melbourne presenter
 David Neitz, former  captain
 Justin Langer, former Australian cricket team coach
 Jakara Anthony, skier & 2022 Winter Olympics gold medallist

See also

NRL Queen's Birthday Clash

References

External links

Queen's Birthday match on AFL Tables.

Monarchy in Australia
Australian Football League games
Australian Football League rivalries
Collingwood Football Club
Melbourne Football Club
Sports competitions in Melbourne
2001 establishments in Australia
Recurring sporting events established in 2001